Schrankia obstructalis is a species of moth of the family Erebidae first described by Francis Walker in 1866. It is found on Borneo.

References

Moths described in 1866
Hypenodinae